Souk El Ghrabliyya is one of the souks of the medina of Tunis.

Location 
The souk is located in the north-east of Al-Zaytuna Mosque, in El Ghrabel Street.

It can be accessed from Souk El Attarine, Souk El Blaghgia, and Souk El Ouzar.

Products 
It is specialized in the producing and selling of sieves.

Notes and references 

Ghrabliyya